Xystreurys is a genus of large-tooth flounders with one species, X. liolepis, found along the Pacific coast of North America from Monterey Bay, California to the Gulf of California and the other, X. rasile, found along the Atlantic coast of South America from Rio de Janeiro, Brazil to the southern tip of Argentina.

Species
There are currently two recognized species in this genus:
 Xystreurys liolepis D. S. Jordan & C. H. Gilbert, 1880 (Fantail flounder)
 Xystreurys rasile (D. S. Jordan, 1891)

References

Paralichthyidae
Taxa named by David Starr Jordan
Taxa named by Charles Henry Gilbert
Marine fish genera